The Palacio Bruna is a palace located on the southern edge of the Parque Forestal in Santiago, Chile. The three story building has an Italian Renaissance character. Julio Bertrand, a Chilean architect, was designated as responsible for its design and construction. He died before seeing the palace completed and his friend Pedro Prado took over and completed the building.

Industrial-scale production of synthetic sodium nitrate and the resulting collapse of the saltpeter price led to the bankruptcy of Bruna's business. In 1921, as a consequence of this event, the palace had to be offered for sale. It was purchased by the U.S. ambassador to Chile, never having been occupied by Augusto Bruna. It housed the American Embassy until 1962 and then served as the U.S. consulate in Santiago from 1962 to 1994. Since 1995, the building has housed the Chilean National Commerce Chamber.

References

Buildings and structures in Santiago